Ebb Tide is a 1937 American Technicolor adventure film directed by James P. Hogan and starring Oscar Homolka, Frances Farmer and Ray Milland.

Much of the film is set in the South Seas and is based on the 1894 novel The Ebb-Tide by Robert Louis Stevenson and his stepson Lloyd Osbourne.

The novel was previously filmed as 1922 Paramount silent film Ebb Tide, and it was filmed again in 1947 as Adventure Island, produced by William H. Pine and William C. Thomas.

Plot
In 1890, three Westerners stranded on a tropical island in the South Pacific get an offer to captain a cargo boat.

Cast
Oscar Homolka as Capt. Thorbecke
Frances Farmer as Faith Wishart
Ray Milland as Robert Herrick
Lloyd Nolan as Attwater
Barry Fitzgerald as Huish
Charles Judels as Port doctor
Charles Stevens as Uncle Ned
David Torrence as Tapena Tom
Lina Basquette as Attwater's servant
Harry Field as Taniera

Production
Paramount had previously filmed the story in 1922. In March 1937 they announced they would film the story again under the title of With the Tide starring Frances Farmer, and produced by Lucien Hubbard. Lloyd Osborne was writing the script and Hubbard wanted Henry Hathaway to direct. Paramount were going to make the film as one of its two color movies for the season.

By April Paramount had decided to revert to the story's original title and Ray Milland had joined the cast with Hathaway to direct. Then Oscar Homolka, at the time best known for playing a role in Rhodes of Africa, signed a four-year contract with Paramount and was given a lead role in Ebb Tide. Barry Fitzgerald and Lloyd Nolan rounded out the main cast.

Henry Hathaway was delayed on shooting Souls at Sea so he was replaced as director by James Hogan.

Filming started June 1937. Island scenes were shot at a specially-constructed village on Catalina Island. Over one hundred Polynesians were used.

The film was shot in color at a time when that was rare.

Paramount took up Farmer's option after she made the film.

References

External links

southseascinema.org

1937 films
1930s adventure drama films
1930s color films
American adventure drama films
1930s English-language films
Films scored by Victor Young
Films set in Oceania
Films directed by James Patrick Hogan
Films based on British novels
Films based on works by Robert Louis Stevenson
Paramount Pictures films
Films set on islands
1937 drama films
1930s American films